Silvanus is a genus of beetles in the family Silvanidae, containing the following species:

 Silvanus bidentatus Fabricius
 Silvanus castaneus MacLeay
 Silvanus curvispinus Pal & Sen Gupta
 Silvanus difficilis Halstead
 Silvanus gibbus Pal & Sen Gupta
 Silvanus imitatus Pal & Sen Gupta
 Silvanus inarmatus Wollaston
 Silvanus lateritius Broun
 Silvanus lewisi Reitter
 Silvanus mediocris Grouvelle
 Silvanus muticus Sharp
 Silvanus nigrans Pal & Sen Gupta
 Silvanus nitidulus LeConte
 Silvanus planatus Germar
 Silvanus productus Halstead
 Silvanus proximus Grouvelle
 Silvanus recticollis Reitter
 Silvanus robustus Halstead
 Silvanus rossi Halstead
 Silvanus ruficorpus Pal & Sen Gupta
 Silvanus semus Halstead
 Silvanus unidentatus Olivier

References

Silvanidae genera
Silvanidae